Kharyastka is a rural locality (an ulus) in Mukhorshibirsky District, Republic of Buryatia, Russia. The population was 898 as of 2010. There are 3 streets.

Geography 
Kharyastka is located 38 km northwest of Mukhorshibir (the district's administrative centre) by road. Khoshun-Uzur is the nearest rural locality.

References 

Rural localities in Mukhorshibirsky District